The General Strike of 1917 can refer to:
the Australian General Strike of 1917
the Spanish General Strike of 1917
the Finnish General Strike of 1917